Chase Beeler (born December 28, 1986) is a former American football center for the St. Louis Rams of the National Football League (NFL).  He played college football at Stanford University, and was recognized as a consensus All-American.  The San Francisco 49ers signed him as an undrafted free agent in 2011. He is currently a Principal with the private equity firm, Altamont Capital Partners.

Early years
A native of Jenks, Oklahoma, Beeler attended Jenks High School.  Rated as a three-star recruit by Rivals.com, Beeler was listed as the No. 22 offensive guard prospect in the class of 2006.

He received an athletic scholarship to attend Stanford University, and played for coach Jim Harbaugh's Stanford Cardinal football team from 2007 to 2010.

Professional career
Beeler was signed by the San Francisco 49ers as an undrafted free agent following the 2011 NFL Draft, but was released by the 49ers on September 3, 2011.  The following day, he was signed to the 49ers practice squad.

On September 1, 2012, he joined the Philadelphia Eagles practice squad. Later that month, he joined the St. Louis Rams practice squad.  A few months later, Beeler was no longer with the Rams.

References

External links

1986 births
Living people
All-American college football players
American football centers
Oklahoma Sooners football players
People from Jenks, Oklahoma
Players of American football from Oklahoma
San Francisco 49ers players
Stanford Cardinal football players